Ngozika Ekwelum (born 15 March 1948) is a Nigerian former heavyweight boxer, who held the Nigerian and African Boxing Union heavyweight titles in the 1970s and 1980s.

Career
From Anambra State, as an amateur, Ekwelum competed in the 1970 Commonwealth Games in Edinburgh, losing in the quarter-final to Irishman John McKinty.

Ekwelum spent much of his professional career based in Germany. He made his professional debut in September 1973, knocking out Ireno Werleman in the second round. Two months later, in his third fight, he drew with former Italian champion Armando Zanini in Brescia. In his next fight, in February 1974, he suffered his first professional defeat, to the vastly experienced Argentine Avenamar Peralta. He followed this the next month with a drawn fight with another Argentine, Santiago Alberto Lovell. A seventh-round knockout of Richard Dunn followed in April 1974. In January 1975 he knocked Eddie Neilson down four times before winning by a send-round stoppage, and a month later lost a narrow points decision to Billy Aird, both of these fights taking place in England. Back in Germany, between March 1975 and May 1976, he won five fights and drew one. In November 1976 he travelled to Madrid to face Argentine champion Raul Gorosito, the 8-round fight judged a draw. In December 1976 he beat future world title challenger Lucien Rodriguez on points, then had a run of three defeats; First, in January 1977 he was stopped in the seventh round in Johannesburg by Kallie Knoetze, which saw him receive a lifetime ban from the Nigerian Boxing Board of Control for fighting in South Africa. In May he was stopped in the sixth round by John L. Gardner at the Royal Albert Hall, in what would have been a fight for the vacant Commonwealth title, but the Nigerian authorities refused to sanction it due to Ekwelum's fight in South Africa. He was then out of the ring until September 1978, when he was disqualified in the third round against Hennie Thoonen in Heerenveen for punching with the inside of the glove. He returned to winning ways in November 1978 with a fifth-round stoppage of German (BDB) champion Bernd August, and then in 1979 became based back in is home country, the ban evidently lifted. He had immediate success, knocking Eddie Cooper out in March to win the Nigerian heavyweight title. In October that year he knocked out Joe Kalala in the third round to take the African Boxing Union (ABU) title. In December 1979 he travelled to Canada to face Trevor Berbick, losing via a fifth-round stoppage. In March 1980 he stopped Paul Sykes in the first round, in what would prove to be his final win. He lost his ABU title in December 1983 to Proud Kilimanjaro, the Zimbabwean knocking him out in the twelfth and final round. In November 1984 he lost to Malian Mary Konate, and in his final fight in August 1986, at the age of 38, he was beaten on points by Charles Udalor in a Nigerian heavyweight title clash.

In 2015, he was reportedly planning to open a boxing academy in Awka, Anambra State.

References

1948 births
Living people
Nigerian male boxers
Heavyweight boxers
African Boxing Union champions
Sportspeople from Lagos